Plus was a digital channel run by Granada Sky Broadcasting. It was launched on 1 October 1996 under the original name of Granada Plus, and during its availability it underwent successive rebrands as G Plus, G+ and then simply Plus. However, it remained widely referred to by the public at large by its original name. On 1 November 2004, it was permanently closed down by ITV plc in an attempt to bring its replacement, ITV3, onto Sky.

History
Granada Plus was launched on 1 October 1996 at 7pm. From launch, the channel initially showed only programmes made originally by Granada Television and London Weekend Television (itself recently acquired by Granada Television), such as On the Buses, Crown Court, The Comedians and The Wheeltappers and Shunters Social Club. One of the channel's biggest attractions was a thrice-daily repeat of classic Coronation Street, with a five episode omnibus every weekend. The channel started showing episodes in original broadcast order from April 1976, (some cut slightly for timing reasons), until they got up to February 1994 on 1 November 2004. After Plus had secured the rights to show programmes originally made by Yorkshire Television, they started showing classic episodes of Emmerdale, usually straight after Coronation Street, at 9:30 in the morning and 12:30 in the afternoon, each weekday.

Many of these programmes would have been unshown since their original transmissions, and hence were of value to those interested in classic television, but these early schedules lacked the commercial appeal of rival channel UK Gold, which had long since moved from showing little-seen gems to showing television's 'greatest hits'.

Before the launch of ITV2, the channel also occasionally broadcast live UEFA Champions League football matches involving either Manchester United or Newcastle United on nights when the national ITV network was unable to broadcast the matches live.

It was not long before Granada Plus revamped their on-screen identity, and in order to look more contemporary, they started showing more recent programmes made by the ITV network (at the time, Granada were busy buying up old rivals such as Yorkshire Television and Tyne Tees Television, in preparation for a unified ITV plc), as well as programme stock which had been originally shown on the BBC. Granada Plus also began screening many classic US shows popular with British viewers and airing promos with the stars of those shows (such as James MacArthur for Hawaii Five-O, Cheryl Ladd for Charlie's Angels, Philip Michael Thomas for Miami Vice and Ben Murphy for Alias Smith and Jones - the last two had also originally aired on the BBC in Britain). The channel also aired British premieres of at least three US series: 10-8: Officers on Duty, Fortune Hunter and the 1988 revival of Mission: Impossible.

Many of the channel's programmes were cut by up to five minutes for commercial timing purposes, which was not a popular choice with viewers.

Closure

The future of Plus came into doubt by late 2003, when ITV had planned for a new channel similar to Plus to be launched. Originally conceived as 'ITV Gold', it evolved in its conception to ITV3. It would have been originally launched on both Freeview, NTL and Telewest, with a later launch on Sky in March 2005, likely due to ITV rejecting a deal to encrypt ITV3, and the limitations faced by Sky boxes in exceeding the 500 channel limit. Due to the similarity in both channels' content, many believed that ITV3 would replace Plus, only for this rumour to be frequently debunked by GSB themselves. ITV also looked to either sell or close the GSB channels.

However, come 1 November 2004 — ITV3's launch date — it was looking increasingly likely that ITV plc's new channel would not be launched on Sky Digital. However, frantic discussions were going on behind the scenes: ITV wanted the 7 million or so Sky viewers available; Sky did not want to give Freeview any advantage; and to further complicate matters, ITV wanted the new channel to be as high up on the EPG as possible. ITV looked into Plus, which was in a high EPG slot, channel 118. Plus also had access to archives of programmes that were sought after by ITV for the new channel.

At 1pm on that day, just 8 hours before launch, ITV and Sky finally reached a deal: ITV would buy out Sky's 49.5% stake in GSB for £10 million. This meant ITV plc completely took full control of the two GSB channels, Plus and Men & Motors.

Shortly afterwards, ITV plc decided to close Plus, and moved ITV2 to channel 118 making space for ITV3.

An hour-and-a-half later that afternoon, while in the middle of a commercial break, Plus suddenly cut to a closedown slide, and, on digital cable and satellite platforms, shortly afterwards disappeared. The final programme on Plus was Pie in the Sky, but only half of it was shown before ITV ceased transmission of Plus. On Sky, Plus was immediately removed minutes after closure, with ITV2 and ITV3 appearing on channels 118 and 119 in an EPG update. On NTL and Telewest, Plus broadcast a GSB logo with looped music, before cutting into a test card asking viewers to move to ITV3. 
Transmission of Plus officially ceased at 5:15pm, when it was replaced by holding slides for ITV3. The channel was replaced on digital cable and satellite, but on analogue cable, the closedown slide remained for over six years and was finally removed in April 2011 due to analogue cable becoming obsolete.

The team at Plus were caught unaware as they had sent out their regular highlights email at 3:50pm. ITV3 launched at 9pm.

Programming

10-8: Officers on Duty
A Bit of a Do 
A Bit of Fry & Laurie (now on Gold)
A Family at War (now on Talking Pictures TV)
. Allsorts
The Adventures of Sherlock Holmes (now on ITV3)
Agatha Christie's Poirot (now on ITV3)
Albion Market
Alfresco
Alias Smith and Jones
An Audience with...
Aspel & Company
The Avengers (now on ITV4)
Batman 
Beadle's About
The Benny Hill Show
Bewitched (now on Gold)
Bless This House (now on Forces TV and ITV3) 
Blind Date
Bonanza (now on CBS Action)
Boon
The Brian Conley Show
Brian Conley: This Way up!
The Brittas Empire (now on Gold)
Brush Strokes (now on Drama)
Bullseye (now on Challenge)
Cagney & Lacey
Canned Carrott
Carrott's Commercial Breakdown
Charlie's Angels
Classic Coronation Street (now on ITV3)
Classic Emmerdale (now on ITV3)
Cold Feet
The Comedians
Crown Court
The Dame Edna Experience
Dandelion Dead
Dempsey & Makepeace (now on Forces TV and ITV4)
The Dick Emery Show
The Dick Van Dyke Show
Doctor in the House
The Dukes of Hazzard
Duty Free (now on Forces TV)
The Elvis Presley Show
Ever Decreasing Circles (now on Gold)
The Equalizer (now on Forces TV)
Faith in the Future
Fame
Families
The Flying Lady
Fortune Hunter
French Fields (now on Drama) 
Fresh Fields (now on Drama)
George and Mildred (now on ITV3)
Gladiators
The Grumbleweeds Radio Show
The Gunners
Hadleigh
Hale and Pace
Happy Days
Hart to Hart
Hawaii Five-O
Heartbeat (now on ITV3)
The High Chaparral 
Hill Street Blues
Hogan's Heroes (now on ITV4)
Home to Roost (now on Forces TV)
Hornblower! (now on ITV4)
I Dream of Jeannie (now on Forces TV)
In Loving Memory (now on ITV3)
In Sickness and in Health
Inspector Morse (now on ITV3)
The Jack Dee Show
Jeeves & Wooster 
The Kenny Everett Video Show
The Krypton Factor
The Liver Birds 
London's Burning
Love Thy Neighbour
Magnum, P.I. 
Man About the House (now on ITV3)
Marc
Me and my Girl
Miami Vice
Minder (now on ITV4)
Mind Your Language
Mission: Impossible (now on CBS Justice)
Murder, She Wrote (now on 5USA)
My Favorite Martian
My Wife and Kids
The New Statesman
No Place Like Home
Not on Your Nellie!
Only When I Laugh 
On the Buses (now on ITV3)
Peak Practice
Pie in the Sky (now on Drama)
The Piglet Files (now on Gold)
The Professionals (now on ITV4)
The Rag Trade
Rich Tea and Sympathy
Rising Damp (now on ITV3)
Robin's Nest (now on Talking Pictures TV)
The Rockford Files
Rory McGrath's Commercial Breakdown
The Ruth Rendell Mysteries
The Saint (now on ITV4)
Second Thoughts (now on Forces TV)
Shang-a-Lang!
Shelley
Shortland Street
Singles
Sorry! (now on Gold)
Spitting Image
The Stanley Baxter Picture Show
The Stanley Baxter Series
Starsky and Hutch Stay Lucky!StingersSupersonicSurgical SpiritSurprise! Surprise!The Sweeney (now on ITV4)Sykes (now on Forces TV)Taggart (now on Alibi and Drama)Tales of the Unexpected (now on Sky Arts)Terry and June That's My Boy!There's Nothing to Worry About!Thomas & SarahThrough the KeyholeTill Death Us Do PartThe Two of usThe Upper Hand Up Pompeii!Upstairs, Downstairs (now on Talking Pictures TV)Up the Garden PathVan der Valk (now on Talking Pictures TV)Waiting for God (now on Drama)WatchingThe Wheeltappers and Shunters Social ClubWish Me LuckWycliffe (now on ITV3)You Bet!You're Only Young Twice'' (now on ITV3)

See also
Granada Sky Broadcasting
Granada Television
ITV3
Men & Motors

References

External links
Granada Plus at TVARK.

Defunct television channels in the United Kingdom
Television channels and stations established in 1996
Television channels and stations disestablished in 2004
Granada Plus